The Jewish Ledger is Connecticut's only weekly Jewish newspaper. The Hartford newspaper also has a monthly edition serving the Greater Hartford and western Massachusetts area.

It was founded in April 1929 by Samuel Neusner (who had come to the United States from Poland at the age of 10, in 1906) and Rabbi Abraham J. Feldman.  Berthold Gaster, whose father had survived the Dachau and Buchenwald concentration camps, became the newspaper's managing editor in 1958.  Lee Neusner was publisher from 1960 to 1966, when she sold it to Gaster and Shirley Bunis. In 1992, the paper was sold to NRG Connecticut Limited Partnership.

As of 2015, the editor was Judie Jacobson.  Jonathan S. Tobin, currently of The Jewish Exponent of Philadelphia, is a former editor of the Jewish Ledger.

References

External links 
Jewish Ledger website
American Jewish Press Association Member Profile
The Connecticut Jewish Ledger Obituary Database
Jewish Ledger Facebook page

Jewish newspapers published in the United States
Jews and Judaism in Connecticut
Newspapers published in Connecticut
Weekly newspapers published in the United States
Publications established in 1929
West Hartford, Connecticut
Mass media in Hartford County, Connecticut